The 2011 Charleston Southern Buccaneers football team represented Charleston Southern University as a member of the Big South Conference during the 2011 NCAA Division I FCS football season. Led by ninth-year head coach Jay Mills, the Buccaneers compiled an overall record of 0–11 with a mark of 0–6 in conference play, placing last out of seven teams in the Big South.  It was the second winless season in program history as the team also went 0–11 in 1994. Charleston Southern played home games at Buccaneer Field in Charleston, South Carolina.

Schedule

References

Charleston Southern
Charleston Southern Buccaneers football seasons
College football winless seasons
Charleston Southern Buccaneers football